The 2020 Russian Wheelchair Curling Championship was held from March 16 to 23 at the Curling club "Pingvin" in Novosibirsk.

Teams

Round robin

Group A

Group B

 Teams to semi-finals
 Teams to quarterfinals (Qualification games 2nd round)
 Teams to 1/8 finals (Qualification games 1st round)
Points: 2 for win, 1 for loss, 0 for technical loss (did not start)

Playoffs

1/8 finals (Qualification games 1st round)March 21, 14:30

Game for 9th placeMarch 21, 14:30

Game for 11th placeMarch 21, 14:30

Quarterfinals (Qualification games 2nd round)March 21, 18:30

Game for 5th placeMarch 22, 10:30

Game for 7th placeMarch 22, 10:30

Semi-finalsMarch 22, 10:30

Bronze medal gameMarch 22, 15:30

FinalMarch 22, 15:30

Final standings

References

See also
2020 Russian Men's Curling Championship
2020 Russian Women's Curling Championship
2020 Russian Mixed Curling Championship
2020 Russian Mixed Doubles Curling Championship
2020 Russian Junior Curling Championships

Curling competitions in Russia

Russian Wheelchair Curling Championship
Curling Wheelchair Championship
Russian Wheelchair Curling Championship
Sport in Novosibirsk